The Adventures of Star Saver, known in Japan as , is a 2D platform game for the Game Boy. It is a quasi-sequel to the earlier Miracle Ropitt for Famicom.

Summary

A boy named Kevin and his sister Connie are forced to go inside an unidentified flying object by a group of aliens who are planning to invade the galaxy. They are later exiled to a distant planet after refusing to engage in espionage for their side.

Kevin finds himself stranded on a strange planet where nothing is familiar (and without his sister). However, a mech called Tom Wolf that has a vast knowledge of telepathic skills saves him and empowers Kevin with the ability to take on the aliens' army. This machine becomes an important ally in the battle to save Connie and stop the extraterrestrial invasion before it's too late. The game forces players to fight strange aliens across the galaxy. Various power-ups can be collected to add to the mech's abilities. However, the mech is lost after a single hit. The game includes some surreal enemies like a domestic dog and musical notes.

In the Japanese version, the plot is slightly different. Here, the player instead takes control of the sister who has to rescue her brother from the aliens.

Legacy
In 1992, the sequel was released titled Rubble Saver II. This game was never released in America because of The Adventures of Star Saver releasing internationally in 1992. However it did get a European release, but for the same reason the game was retitled to "Max" and also because Infogrames published the sequel in Europe. Max was also the name of the protagonist of The Adventures of Star Saver which was used in the game. On the box of The Adventures of Star Saver the name Kevin is used instead.

References

1991 video games
Game Boy-only games
Video games about extraterrestrial life
Video games about mecha
Apocalyptic video games
Platform games
Science fiction video games
Shoot 'em ups
Taito games
Game Boy games
Alien invasions in video games
Post-apocalyptic video games
Video games set on fictional planets
Video games developed in Japan